Kitty Flanagan (born 1968) is an Australian comedian, writer and actress who works in Australia and the United Kingdom. She has also performed in France, Germany, the Netherlands, South Africa, and Japan and at the Edinburgh Festival Fringe and Montreal Just For Laughs festival.

Flanagan won the AACTA Award for Best Comedy Performer in 2021 and the TV Week Silver Logie Award for Most Popular Actress in 2022 for her performance in Fisk.

Early life
Flanagan attended high school at Monte Sant'Angelo Mercy College in North Sydney. She became drawn to comedy in Year 5 when she appeared in a school musical production of Alice In Wonderland in which she dressed as a bunny which pretended to fall asleep during the performance. Flanagan said that "Secretly I always wanted to be an actor, but I knew that I didn't have the mindset for it." She recalls that as a teenager, she would put on avant-garde performance shows with her younger sister Penny and they would involve their younger brother Michael by dressing him in tutus and giving him dance moves to do.

Career
In Australia, Flanagan has appeared on various television series including Full Frontal, The Project, Rove Live, The Weekly with Charlie Pickering, Have You Been Paying Attention? and Utopia. In the United Kingdom she is known for her appearances on The Sketch Show.

Early career
At the age of 21, Flanagan road-tripped around Australia and liked Western Australia so much that she moved there and lived in the Perth suburb of Cottesloe for a couple of years and later lived in Bunbury and Geraldton. She occasionally read news and weather at a country radio station, waited tables and lasted only three weeks cleaning and packing crayfish in a Geraldton crayfish factory before she resigned. She trained and briefly worked as a physical education teacher before beginning a job in advertising.

In 1989, Flanagan began her five-year stint as an advertising agency copywriter, creating campaigns for products such as Quik chocolate drinking powder. After five years as a copywriter, she was fired in June 1993. Following her exit from advertising, she worked as a bartender at a hotel where there was an open mic night, so she decided to try stand-up. Her first attempt was a success and she then started her comedy career in 1994 doing stand-up at an open mic night at the Harold Park Hotel in Sydney. Her debut performance at the Harold Park Hotel led to a spot in the final of the hotel's Comic of the Year competition where she placed third and won a bottle of red wine. Flanagan had been doing stand-up comedy for six months before she was spotted in December 1994 by the producer of Full Frontal. Flanagan joined the cast as both a writer and performer in 1995. Flanagan left Full Frontal in late 1996 to concentrate on her stand-up while she continued writing and acting for television in Shaun Micallef's World Around Him, The Micallef Program, The 50 Foot Show and The Fat.

2001–2009: UK and the world
Flanagan moved to the UK in 2001 to further her comedy career and do more stand-up. She performed on television in The Sketch Show as well as making numerous stand-up appearances on The World Stands Up for Comedy Central. As well as performing, she produced a short film, Dating Ray Fenwick, in which she also had a small role and also wrote material for her former Sketch Show co-star Karen Taylor's sketch comedy show Touch Me, I'm Karen Taylor. She also wrote for various other shows on the BBC, Channel Four and Sky Television. She also worked with author and screenwriter Sean Condon to develop his screwball comedy script Splitsville as a hook for a television series, which later evolved into an e-book. During her time in the UK, she would regularly return to Australia for short visits and appear on television shows including Rove, Good News Week, Spicks and Specks and The Sideshow.
 
Flanagan took her stand-up internationally and performed at many major comedy festivals, including Edinburgh, Melbourne, Montreal, Kilkenny, Cape Town and Johannesburg.

2009–2021
After eight years touring the world and performing stand-up in comedy clubs in England, she returned to live in Australia in 2009. She had three months worth of work lined up in Australia and more kept coming in so she decided to stay. She starred in the Comedy Channel's 2009 TV special I Can't Believe It's Not Better before being contacted to join The Project for segments on trending news topics.

In 2010, Flanagan began touring Australia with her stand-up comedy show Charming and Alarming. She toured with her sister and show co-star Penny Flanagan and tour manager and former Full Frontal co-star Glenn Butcher, who is the founding member of the 1980s Newcastle comedy troupe the Castanet Club.

In 2013, Flanagan toured Australia again in the stand-up show Hello Kitty Flanagan.

In 2013, while in Montreal to perform her stand up show Hello Kitty Flanagan, she appeared as a guest comedian on a television special hosted by Wil Anderson called Wil Does Montreal: Just For Laughs which explored what goes on behind the scenes of Montreal's Just for Laughs international comedy festival and featured some of the world's best-known comedians. Working Dog Productions asked Flanagan to work on their TV comedy series Utopia in 2013 and cast her in the role of Rhonda the public relations manager, which Flanagan played for three seasons.

Flanagan resigned from The Project in August 2014 but stayed for four months to finish the year. Charlie Pickering approached her to join his new TV show, The Weekly with Charlie Pickering, where she created the segments "Spectacular Failures of the 21st Century" and "Problem Solver". As the series progressed, Flanagan created two other segments, "Bandwagon Rider" and "Human Barometer".

For two weeks during the end of 2014 and early 2015, Flanagan was a stand-in for Annabel Crabb's weekly newspaper column for Fairfax Media.

In February 2015, Flanagan was the third ambassador for the Adelaide Fringe, succeeding singer Katie Noonan and inaugural Adelaide Fringe ambassador and fellow comedian Paul McDermott.  She toured Australia with her third stand-up comedy show Seriously? in 2015, with her entourage of two.

Flanagan is an advocate of writing and writers in the screen industry. She sponsored the Best Narrative Award at the 2015 Heart of Gold International Short Film Festival in Gympie and was one of the judges for the film scripts in that category.

In 2017, Flanagan and her sister Penny contributed as writers for the TV series Drop Dead Weird. Flanagan began an Australian national tour of her fourth standup show named Smashing in the same year.

In March 2018, Flanagan released a book of personal and professional autobiographical stories called Bridge Burning and Other Hobbies.

Flanagan announced her departure from The Weekly With Charlie Pickering during the final episode of season four (2018), but returned for The Yearly with Charlie Pickering special in December 2018.

In August 2018, Flanagan presented a sketch on her "pretend" book called 488 Rules for Life: An Antidote to Idiots, as a joke inspired by Jordan Peterson's book 12 Rules for Life, on The Weekly with Charlie Pickering. This idea inspired a published book in 2019 called 488 Rules for Life: The Thankless Art of Being Correct.

In March, 2021 Flanagan's sitcom Fisk, which she co-created, co-wrote, co-directed and starred in, aired on ABC TV. Fisk was nominated for two 2021 AACTA Awards and won both awards for Best Narrative Comedy Series and Best Comedy Performer for Kitty Flanagan.

Corporate work and literary events
Flanagan tailors her comedy material to suit corporate events, galas, award nights and launches. Flanagan has written and presented videos for clients such as Nokia and Subaru. An accomplished Master of ceremonies, Flanagan hosted countless awards nights and provided after-dinner hilarity for companies as diverse as Australia Post and the Australian Pharmaceutical Association. Flanagan was Master of ceremonies at 2015 Art of Music Live which is a music concert held every two years, where a group of Australia's top visual artists come together to create an original exhibition and each artist chooses an iconic Australian/New Zealand song to inspire an artwork. The work is then auctioned at a gala dinner in the Art Gallery of New South Wales with all proceeds from Art Of Music Live going to Nordoff-Robbins Music Therapy, who transform lives through music.

In 2012, Flanagan joined a panel of writers, musicians and artists for the literary event called "Women of Letters", an interactive talk that examines the lost art of letter writing and also celebrates women in writing. Funds raised go to a Victorian not-for-profit charity animal rescue centre called Edgar's Mission Farm Sanctuary. In 2013, Flanagan was invited to be part of Adelaide's new literary festival called Word Adelaide, where she participated in two events during the four-day program. Flanagan hosted 'Yarn Spinning', the opening event of Word Adelaide that celebrates two long established Australian traditions: telling tall stories and going to the pub. Flanagan also featured in the event 'In Their Own Words', sharing the stage with Matt Lucas of Little Britain fame, Professor Roly Sussex and musician Guy Pratt who performed in bands Pink Floyd and Icehouse, to explore how the language of comedy has changed our lives and culture.

Hosting
Flanagan hosted and performed stand-up at the Melbourne International Comedy Festival Gala in 2010.
Flanagan hosted and performed stand-up comedy at the 'Opening Night Comedy Allstars Supershow' to launch the Melbourne International Comedy Festival in March 2017, which then screened on the ABC and ABC iview in April 2017.
In 2017, Flanagan co-hosted New Year's Eve: The Early Night Show with Hoot the Owl, which screened on the ABC and ABC iview in December as part of the public broadcaster's New Year's Eve programming.

Community and charity work
In 2013, Flanagan and her dog Henry became ambassadors for Delta Society which involves taking trained therapy dogs to visit hospitals, care facilities and schools across Australia.
As ambassador, Flanagan helped the Delta Society to spread the word and promote Delta Society's charitable programs including Delta Therapy Dogs, Classroom Canines and Delta Dog Safe. Flanagan is particularly fond of Delta's Classroom Canines program which uses the principles of dog therapy to assist children with reading difficulties and gets children excited about reading and writing.

Flanagan has donated her time and talent to perform at charity and fundraising events such as Comedians Unite for the Premier's Disaster Relief Appeal to help victims of Queensland's 2011 floods, and she donated half of the profits from her 2013 Bundaberg show to the Queensland Red Cross Flood Appeal. In 2009, Flanagan performed in Sydney at the Jerry Lewis 'Laugh For Life' Charity Concert to support Muscular Dystrophy Foundation Australia (MDFA) in their fund raising and awareness efforts to fight the devastating muscle wasting disease. Flanagan appeared alongside fellow Australian comedians Julia Morris, Paul McDermott, Mikey Robins, Peter Berner, Fiona O'Loughlin, and Tom Gleeson in the fundraising gig at Sydney's Enmore Theatre. In 2003 while Flanagan was living and working in the UK, she joined some of the UK's top comedians for a charity fundraiser hosted by fellow comedian Steve Coogan. Flanagan appeared alongside Ross Noble, Johnny Vegas, Simon Pegg, Tim Vine, Lee Mack, Matt Lucas, Rob Brydon and Mark Williams in Coogan's 'Drugathon 2' to raise funds for the Chemical Dependency Centre (now named Action on Addiction) and RAPt (The Rehabilitation of Prisoners Trust).

Personal life
Flanagan was born in Manly, a suburb in Sydney's north. Her father, John Flanagan, is an Australian author, best known for the Ranger's Apprentice and Brotherband novel series.
Her sister, Penny Flanagan, is a musician and one half of 1990s indie band Club Hoy; she often appears in Kitty's shows.
Her brother, Michael, is a chef and runs a coffee shop in the snowfields of Japan.
Flanagan lives in Melbourne, with a Burmese cat named Sarge and two dogs, one a Havanese dog named Henry.

Awards and nominations

ARIA Music Awards
The ARIA Music Awards are a set of annual ceremonies presented by Australian Recording Industry Association (ARIA), which recognise excellence, innovation, and achievement across all genres of the music of Australia. They commenced in 1987.

! 
|-
| 2017 || Seriously? || ARIA Award for Best Comedy Release ||  || 
|-

Stand-up comedy tours

Filmography

Web series

DVD releases

Discography

Singles
 2014: Middle Age Lady

Books
 2018: Bridge Burning and Other Hobbies by Kitty Flanagan
 2019: 488 Rules for Life: The Thankless Art of Being Correct by Kitty Flanagan
 2021: More Rules for Life: A Special Volume for Enthusiasts by Kitty Flanagan

Published contributions
 2014: 'Sharing the things we don't like makes a good date' (Fairfax Media)
 2015: 'Being child-free is no reason to keep mum' (Fairfax Media)
 2015: 'Is so much noise really necessary?' (Fairfax Media)
2015: 'Here's the tip: US customs is a grey area' (Fairfax Media)
2016: 'Ankle-biters are a total walk in the park' (Fairfax Media)
2016: 'The stupid appliances we waste money on' (Fairfax Media)
2016: 'Modern houses don't need so many bathrooms' (Fairfax Media)
2016: 'Assimilation won't happen overnight but it will happen, just like Pantene' (Fairfax Media)
2016: 'Here's a fact: an opinion is not the same as a fact' (Fairfax Media)
2017: 'When I look at Donald Trump, I see a bit of myself' (Fairfax Media)
2017: 'Teenagers know absolutely everything, except...' (Fairfax Media)
2017: 'Donald Trump has taught me anyone can be a dictator' (Fairfax Media)
2018: 'Avoid the lazy cliches and dig deep for conversation starters with children at Christmas' (Fairfax Media)
2018: 'What's not to love about pavlova? Plenty actually' (Fairfax Media)
2018: 'Let's wrap up this grabby gift registry caper' (Fairfax Media)
2018: 'Kitty Flanagan: A ham-handed separation.' Extract from Kitty Flanagan's Bridge Burning and Other Hobbies, published by Allen and Unwin (Fairfax Media)

References

External links
Kitty Flanagan official site

Australian stand-up comedians
Australian women comedians
Comedians from Sydney
Living people
1970 births
People from Manly, New South Wales
People educated at Monte Sant'Angelo Mercy College